The National Basketball League (NBL) is a basketball league founded by Basketball Association of Singapore (BAS). BAS organizes the men's division and women's division.

In 2022, Malaysia Basketball Association announced the establishment of a new professional basketball league called Major Basketball League Malaysia, replacing Malaysia Pro League. Singapore Adroit currently takes place as country's only team.

All-time teams

Men's
 Adroit
 GBA Hoops
 SAFSA 
 Nanyang 
 Eng Tat Hornets
 SG Basketball
 Siglap Basketball Club
 Tagawa
 Tong Whye
 Xin Hua Sports Club

Women's
 Adroit-Sheng Gong Culture
 Blazers 
 Hillcrest Grays
 Jumpshot
 Kembangan Chai Chee Red 
 Kembangan Chai Chee White
 Qian Xi Red
 Qian Xi Blue
 Proform
 Radin Mas CSC
 SG Basketball 
 Siglap Basketball Club Black
 Siglap Basketball Club White
 Whye Nam

Results
Men

Women

See also
 Asean Basketball League (ABL)
 Pro-Am Singapore Basketball League (Pro-Am SBL)

References

External links

Sports leagues in Singapore
League
Professional sports leagues in Singapore